Minuscule 588 (in the Gregory-Aland numbering), ε 229 (von Soden), is a Greek minuscule manuscript of the New Testament, on parchment. It is dated by a colophon to the year 1321. The manuscript is lacunose. It was labelled by Scrivener as 457.

Description 

The codex contains the text of the four Gospels on 221 parchment leaves (size ) with some lacunae (Matthew 10:27-13:19; 27:49-28:20; Luke 24:5-53 John 1:1-8; 4:51-7:3). The text is written in one column per page, 21 lines per page.

The part of John 5 is much earlier than the rest of the manuscript.

Text 

The Greek text of the codex is a representative of the Byzantine text-type. Hermann von Soden classified it to the textual family Kr. Aland placed it in Category V.
According to Claremont Profile Method it represents the textual family Kr in Luke 1 and Luke 20. In Luke 10 no profile was made.

History 

There is a note on folio 212 verso: ετελειωθη το παρον αγ[ιον] αυα[γγελιον] δια χειρος εμου του ευτελους ιω[α]ν[νου] ιερεως του περδικαρη και δια εξοδους κυρου γερμανου μοναχου επιερους ς ω κθ ινδ δ’ μη[νι] μαιω εις τας ις ημερα σα[ββα]τω.

The manuscript was added to the list of New Testament manuscripts by Scrivener. It was examined by Dean Burgon.

The manuscript currently is housed at the Biblioteca Ambrosiana (E. 63 sup.), at Milan.

See also 

 List of New Testament minuscules
 Biblical manuscript
 Textual criticism

References

Further reading 

 A. Turyn, Dated Greek Manuscripts of the Thirteenth and Fourteenth Centuries in the Libraries of Italy, (Urbana, 1972), 118; description pp. 141–142.
 Catalogus graecorum Bibliothecace Ambrosianae (Mediolani 1906), vol. I, pp. 318–319.

Greek New Testament minuscules
14th-century biblical manuscripts